Solaropsidae is a family of air-breathing land snails, terrestrial pulmonate gastropod mollusks in the superfamily Sagdoidea.

Genera
Subfamily Caracolinae Cuezzo, 2003
 Caracolus Montfort, 1810
Subfamily Solaropsinae H. Nordsieck, 1986
 Solaropsis H. Beck, 1837
Genera brought into synonymy
 Caracolla Albers, 1850: synonym of Caracolus Montfort, 1810 (invalid: incorrect subsequent spelling)
 Carocolla Gray, 1825: synonym of Caracolus Montfort, 1810 (incorrect subsequent spelling or emendation)
 Corocolla auct.: synonym of Caracolus Montfort, 1810 (incorrect subsequent spelling)
 Discodoma Swainson, 1840: synonym of Caracolus Montfort, 1810
 Serpentulus H. Adams & A. Adams, 1855: synonym of Caracolus Montfort, 1810
 Vortex Oken, 1815: synonym of Caracolus Montfort, 1810 (Not available name: Published in a work placed on the Official Index by Opinion 417)
 Wurtzorbis Webb, 1970: synonym of Caracolus Montfort, 1810
 Olympus Simone, 2010: synonym of Solaropsis H. Beck, 1837
 Ophidermis Agassiz, 1846: synonym of Solaropsis H. Beck, 1837
 Psadara K. Miller, 1878: synonym of Solaropsis (Psadara) K. Miller, 1878 represented as Solaropsis H. Beck, 1837
 Solarium Spix, 1827: synonym of Solaropsis H. Beck, 1837

References

 Nordsieck, H. (1986). The system of the Stylommatophora (Gastropoda), with special regard to the systematic position of the Clausiliidae, II. Importance of the shell and distribution. Archiv für Molluskenkunde. 117(1−3): 93−116.
 Bouchet P., Rocroi J.P., Hausdorf B., Kaim A., Kano Y., Nützel A., Parkhaev P., Schrödl M. & Strong E.E. (2017). Revised classification, nomenclator and typification of gastropod and monoplacophoran families. Malacologia. 61(1-2): 1-526.
 Calcutt J., Cuezzo M.G., Jackson M. & Salvador R.B. (2020). Phylogenetic relationships and classification of Solaropsidae (Gastropoda: Stylommatophora). Archiv für Molluskenkunde. 149(2): 141-193

External links

Sagdoidea